Jean Rouverol (July 8, 1916 – March 24, 2017) was an American author, actress and screenwriter who was blacklisted by the Hollywood movie studios in the 1950s.

Life and career
Rouverol was born in St. Louis, Missouri, the daughter of playwright Aurania Rouverol, who created Andy Hardy and wrote many of the films in the MGM series. 

Rouverol started acting on the stage. During a break from studying at Stanford she appeared in Max Reinhardt's A Midsummer Night's Dream at the Hollywood Bowl alongside Mickey Rooney as Puck. She was pulled from the play to appear as W. C. Fields' daughter in the comedy It's a Gift (1934), her first motion picture credit. She continued to perform mainly in supporting roles, making another eleven films until 1940 when she married screenwriter Hugo Butler.

With four children coming in quick order, Rouverol did not return to film acting but throughout the 1940s performed on radio, including playing Betty Carter on One Man's Family. While her husband was away serving in the U.S. military during World War II, she wrote her first novella, which she sold to McCall's magazine in 1945. 

By 1950, she had her first screenplay made into a film, but her career was interrupted as a result of the investigations by the House Un-American Activities Committee (HUAC) into Communist influence in Hollywood.

American Communist Party/HUAC
In 1943, Rouverol and her husband had joined the Communist Party of the United States of America (CPUSA). In 1951, when agents for HUAC attempted to subpoena them, Rouverol and her husband chose self-exile to Mexico with their four small children rather than face a possible prison sentence, as endured by some of their friends who were dubbed the Hollywood Ten. Labeled as subversives and dangerous revolutionaries by the government, they did not return to the United States on a permanent basis for thirteen years, during which time they had two more children.

In Mexico, she continued to write screenplays, short stories and articles for various American magazines. Rouverol and Butler wrote three screenplays in Mexico which their agent Ingo Preminger successfully sold to Hollywood. Preminger did this by arranging for friends in the Writers Guild of America to put their names on the scripts in place of Rouverol and Butler. 

In 1960 the family moved to Italy, so Rouverol and her husband could work on a film script. In 1961 the family, with the exception of son Michael and daughter Susan, moved to Rome for two years. After a few years, in 1964 they briefly lived in Mexico again, and then returned to the United States for good. Living in California again, she and her husband continued their screenplay collaboration. She wrote a book on Harriet Beecher Stowe. Her husband died in 1968, shortly before he could rise from the Hollywood blacklist after he and Rouverol co-wrote the film The Legend of Lylah Clare.

In the 1970s, Rouverol returned to writing. She scripted an episode of Little House on the Prairie, and after publishing three books in three years, she was hired as co-head writer for the CBS soap opera Guiding Light. For this show she received a Daytime Emmy nomination and a Writers Guild of America Award. Rouverol, by then sixty years old, left the show in 1976. Her book "Writing for the Soaps" was published in 1984. She taught writing at the University of Southern California and at UCLA Extension.

Rouverol wrote scripts for Search for Tomorrow and As the World Turns. She served four terms on the board of directors of the Writers Guild of America, and in 1987 she received the Guild's Morgan Cox Award as a member "whose vital ideas, continuing efforts and personal sacrifice" best exemplified the ideal of service to the Guild. In 2000, Rouverol (aged 84) published Refugees from Hollywood: A Journal of the Blacklist Years, which told the story of her family's life in exile.

Death
For many years Rouverol lived with actor Cliff Carpenter, who was another former blacklisted performer. Carpenter died on January 9, 2014, at the age of 98. 

Rouverol died on March 24, 2017, at the age of 100.

Filmography

Screenplays
So Young So Bad (1950)
The New Pioneers (1950)
The First Time (1952; uncredited)
Autumn Leaves (1956; front Jack Jevne)
The Miracle (1959; originally uncredited)
Face in the Rain (1963)
The Legend of Lylah Clare (1968)

Books

Harriet Beecher Stowe: Woman Crusader (1968)
Pancho Villa: a biography (1972)
Juárez, a son of the people (1973)
Storm Wind Rising (1974)
Writing for the soaps (1984)
Refugees from Hollywood: A Journal of the Blacklist Years (2000)

References

External links
 

Jean Rouverol(Aveleyman)
Jean Rouverol oral history interview by the Writers Guild Foundation

1916 births
2017 deaths
20th-century American actresses
Actresses from St. Louis
American centenarians
American film actresses
American radio actresses
Screenwriters from California
American soap opera writers
American women screenwriters
Hollywood blacklist
University of California, Los Angeles faculty
University of Southern California faculty
Women soap opera writers
American women television writers
Writers Guild of America Award winners
Screenwriters from Missouri
Women centenarians
American women academics
21st-century American women